Kidi is a 2017 Indian Kannada action thriller film starring Bhuvan Chandra, Pallavi Gowda, Danny Kuttappa and Ugrham Manju. It was directed by S.Raghu and produced under the banner of Master's Choice Creations. The film is a remake of the 2016 Malayalam language movie Kali.

Cast 
R.Bhuvan Chandra as Bhuvan
Pallavi Gowda as Nandhini, Bhuvan's wife
Danny Kuttappa
Manmohan Roy as Shetty
Yathiraj as Inspector
Pavan K as Pavan
Dakshaya as Young Bhuvan

Plot 
Bhuvan (R Bhuvan Chandra), a man with anger management issues, tries to control his temper for the sake of his wife, Nandhini(Pallavi Gowda). However, things take a turn when they drive on a highway one night.

Music 
The music is composed by Emil Mohammad, and the soundtrack was released on 3 June 2017 by Anand Audio.

References

External links

 

2017 films
Kannada remakes of Malayalam films
2010s Kannada-language films
Indian action thriller films
Films set in Karnataka
2017 action thriller films